Withernsea  is a seaside resort and civil parish in Holderness, East Riding of Yorkshire, England.

The Prime Meridian crosses the coast north-west of Withernsea.

At the 2011 UK census, Withernsea had a population of 6,159, an increase on the 2001 UK census figure of 5,980.

Withernsea education system consists of both Withernsea High School, and Withernsea Primary School.

History

Like many seaside resorts, Withernsea has a wide promenade which reaches north and south from Pier Towers, the historic entrance to the pier, built in 1877 at a cost of £12,000. The Pier Towers have been refurbished.

During the mid-19th century the Hull and Holderness Railway was constructed, connecting the nearby city of Hull with Withernsea (via Keyingham and Patrington) and making possible cheap and convenient holidays for Victorian workers and their families, as well as boosting Withernsea's economy. It closed in 1964 and all that remains of it is an overgrown footpath where the track used to be.

Withernsea, like many British resorts, has suffered from a decline in the number of visiting holidaymakers.

In 1916 a flying field (Owthorne), 35 acres in size was established by The Admiralty on the site now occupied by Withernsea High School.  From June 1918 No. 506 Special Duty Flight (No. 251 Squadron) operated from Owthorne.  Another 5 acres of land were requisitioned and Bessoneaux hangars were constructed, and the site then became classified as an aerodrome.  Activities ceased in June 1919 and Flight 506 was disbanded shortly thereafter.

Economy
Following an unsuccessful attempt to purchase the Proudfoot Supermarket, Tesco opened a competing store which originally struggled to attract sales. Tesco resorted to a campaign of price flexing, offering customers £8 off for every £20 spent in their Withernsea branch.
This led to an investigation by the Competition Commission. After their market share increased, Tesco prices returned to a level closer to the national average.
Subsequently, Aldi took over the former Proudfoot supermarket, and are now offering very competitive opposition to Tesco.
Meanwhile, the Withernsea Town Council has bought a former pub and nightclub, centrally located opposite Aldi, and has renamed it the Meridian Centre. A lottery bid for over £400,000 - Reaching Communities building fund - has been successful, and the building is now being refurbished to provide a community centre, including a cinema and performing arts venue.

There is a 9-hole golf course and leisure centre complex (with a gym and indoor pool) and a variety of pubs and restaurants are situated around the centre of the town.

Landmarks

Some of the town's better-known tourist attractions and landmarks include:
 The lighthouse situated on Hull Road with a museum dedicated to the actress Kay Kendall.
 The Pier Towers leading onto a Blue Flag beach.
 Valley Gardens with a large square and outside stage for local events and celebrations.
 Various amusement arcades (informally known as 'muggies') that line the road opposite the Valley Gardens.
 An RNLI lifeboat museum.
 The parish church of St Nicholas, a Grade II* listed building.
 The Greenwich Meridian; Just outside the town.

Media
The area is served by BBC Radio Humberside, Viking FM, Seaside FM, Capital Yorkshire and Greatest Hits East Yorkshire. Ofcom awarded Seaside FM a community radio licence to broadcast to the town on 105.3 MHz and the station launched on 5 October 2007 from studios at 27 Seaside Road. Weekly newspaper The Holderness Gazette also has offices on Seaside Road.

Education
There are a number of primary schools located in Withernsea which serve the surrounding area. Withernsea High School is the main secondary provider and has a technology college. The high school was refurbished in 2015.

Public services
Withernsea has its own hospital owned by the NHS which was subject to services cuts and lost its Accident and Emergency Department facility,
it is now a community hospital. Withernsea has five emergency service stations located within the town, Yorkshire Ambulance Service; Humberside Fire and Rescue Service; Humberside Police; Her Majesty's Coastguard and lifeboat station.

Notable people
Dick Davis, English-American poet, teacher, and award-winning translator of Persian poetry, grew up in Withernsea during the 1950s.
Charles Hotham was vicar of Withernsea from 1640 to 1644.
Birthplace of jazz musician Kenny Baker (1921–1999).

Actress Kay Kendall was born in Withernsea in 1927.

Birthplace of footballer Stuart Gray.
The Ruby Red Performers, a group of dancers who appeared on the 9th series of Britain's Got Talent in 2015, are from Withernsea.

Gallery

References

External links

 
 Withernsea In Pictures
 

 
Towns in the East Riding of Yorkshire
Holderness
Seaside resorts in England
Beaches of the East Riding of Yorkshire
Civil parishes in the East Riding of Yorkshire
Populated coastal places in the East Riding of Yorkshire